Markov (Bulgarian), Markova, and Markoff are common surnames used in Russia and  Bulgaria. Notable people with the name include:

Academics
Ivana Markova (born 1938), Czechoslovak-British emeritus professor of psychology at the University of Stirling
John Markoff (sociologist) (born 1942), American professor of sociology and history at the University of Pittsburgh
Konstantin Markov (1905–1980), Soviet geomorphologist and quaternary geologist

Mathematics, science, and technology
Alexander V. Markov (1965-), Russian biologist
Andrey Markov (1856–1922), Russian mathematician
Vladimir Andreevich Markov (1871–1897), Russian mathematician, brother of Andrey Markov (Sr.)
Andrey Markov Jr. (1903–1979), Russian mathematician and son of Andrey Markov
John Markoff (born 1949), American journalist of computer industry and technology
Moisey Markov (1908–1994), Russian physicist

Performing arts
Albert Markov, Russian American violinist, composer
Alexander Markov, current Russian American violinist
Dame Alicia Markova (1910–2004), British prima ballerina
Margaret Markov (born 1951), Yugoslav-American actress of film and television
Rimma Markova (1925–2015), Soviet and Russian actress
Zuzana Marková (soprano) (born 1988), Czech soprano

Politicians
Helmuth Markov (born 1952), German politician and Member of the European Parliament
Nikolai Yevgenyevich Markov (1866–1945), Russian right-wing politician
Sergey Alexandrovich Markov (born 1958), Russian political scientist, nationalist politician
Vladimir Ivanovich Markov (1859–1919), Russian politician, last Minister-Secretary of State for Finland in Czarist regime

Athletes
Alexei Markov (born 1979), Russian road bicycle racer
Andrei Markov (ice hockey) (born 1978), Russian ice hockey player in the NHL
Danny Markov (born 1976), professional ice hockey player for CSKA Moscow
Dmitri Markov (born 1975), Belarusian pole vaulter representing Australia
Dragomir Markov (born 1971), Bulgarian swimmer
Georgi Markov (footballer) (born 1972), Bulgarian footballer
Georgi Markov (weightlifter) (born 1978), Bulgarian weightlifter
Georgi Markov (wrestler) (born 1946), Bulgarian wrestler
Khristo Markov (born 1965), Bulgarian triple jumper
Ilya Markov (born 1972), Russian race walker
Marko Markov (born 1981), Bulgarian footballer
Miglena Markova (born 1983), Bulgarian rower
Nikolay Markov (footballer) (born 1985), Russian footballer
Olga Markova (athlete) (born 1968), Russian long-distance runner
Olga Markova (figure skater) (born 1974), Russian figure skater

Other fields
Georgi Markov (1929–1978), Bulgarian dissident writer assassinated in London
Philip Markoff (1986–2010), defendant in a murder case known as the "Craigslist killing"
Sergey Markov (1878–1918), Russian army general, anti-Bolshevik during Soviet civil war
Walterina Markova (real name Walter Dempster), Philippine drag queen and World War II sex slave

Fictional characters
 Brion Markov, name of comic book character Geo-Force
 Tara Markov, name of comic book character Terra
 Frantisek Markov, Dungeons & Dragons character
 Sorin Markov, character from Magic: The Gathering storyline
 Ronan Markov,book character from “The Darkest Temptation”

See also
Eufrosina Dvoichenko-Markov, Soviet KGB spy in New York City during World War II
Markov (crater), lunar impact crater that is located in the northwestern part of the Moon's near side
27514 Markov, a main-belt asteroid named after Andrey A. Markov
Markov chain, a mathematical process useful for statistical modeling
Markov random field, a set of random variables having a Markov property described by an undirected graph
Markov's inequality, a probabilistic upper bound
Markovian (disambiguation)
Markovo (disambiguation)
Marković
Markovich
Markovits
Markovski
Markovsky
Marko (surname)

Bulgarian-language surnames
Jewish surnames
Russian-language surnames
Patronymic surnames
Surnames from given names